Pedro Rodrigues may refer to:
 Pedro Rodrigues (athlete)
 Pedro Rodrigues (footballer)

See also
 Pedro Rodríguez (disambiguation)
 Pedro Rodrigues Filho, Brazilian serial killer, spree killer, and vigilante